is a Japanese voice actor from Tokyo, Japan. He is affiliated with Haikyo.

Filmography

Anime

 Onegai My Melody Kirara – Hiroshi
 Kannagi – Male Guest
 Jewelpet – 先鋒
 Tatakau Shisho: The Book of Bantorra – Ronkeny
 Fairy Tail (–present) – Max Alors, Kawazu
 Chu-Bra!! – Male student
 Durarara!! – Kanazawa
 Big Windup! – Jun Furusawa (Summer Tournament)
 Jewelpet (–12) – Nix (Twinkle, Sunshine, Kira☆Deco)
 Lilpri – Various characters
 Mayoi Neko Overrun! – Student
 Mitsudomoe (–11) – Gachi Black
 Highschool of the Dead – Male student
 Wandering Son – Makoto Ariga
 Beyblade: Metal Fusion – Stray Blader (はぐれブレーダー)
 Sket Dance – Masatoshi Kosaka
 Yu-Gi-Oh! Zexal – Fuya Okudaira
 Battle Spirits: Heroes – Various characters
 Cross Fight B-Daman – Asuka Kamiogi
 Ben-To – Hiroaki Uchimoto
 High School D×D (–15) – Genshiro Saji (3 seasons) 
 The Familiar of Zero F – Doudou
 The Knight in the Area – Sakurai studies (桜井学)
 Lagrange: The Flower of Rin-ne – Sōta Serizawa (2 seasons, OVA)
 Place to Place – Male student
 Sengoku Collection – Staff
 Dusk Maiden of Amnesia – Male student
 Sakamichi no Apollon – Boy
 Hyōka – Occult Research staff
 Campione! – Sorimachi, Student B
 My Little Monster – Shimoyanagi
 Hidamari Sketch × Honeycomb – Various characters
 JoJo's Bizarre Adventure – Boy
 Little Busters! – Student
 Bakuman. – Shun Shiratori (season 3)
 Joshiraku – Doctor OVA 
 The Devil Is a Part-Timer! (–22) – Mitsuki Sarue (Sariel) (2 seasons)
 Oreimo – Kōki Mikagami
 Stella Women’s Academy, High School Division Class C³ – Daishichi Hamakaze
 Code Geass: Akito the Exiled (–16) – Simon Mericourt OVA 
 Gaist Crusher – Hayato Kongōji
 Swing Out Sisters Yuuta (OVA; credited as Akagawa Tomato)
 Marvel Disk Wars: The Avengers – Hikaru Akatsuki
 The Kawai Complex Guide to Manors and Hostel Behavior – Kazunari Usa
 DRAMAtical Murder – Sei
 Log Horizon – Quon (season 2)
 When Supernatural Battles Became Commonplace – Yanagi Akutagawa
 Cute High Earth Defense Club LOVE! – Masuya Tazawa 
 Durarara!!x2 – Kanazawa, Yatabe
 The Asterisk War (–16) – Silas Norman 2 seasons 
 Tanaka-kun Is Always Listless – Kato
 Ozmafia – Soh
 Danganronpa 3: The End of Hope's Peak High School – Various characters
 Touken Ranbu: Hanamaru – Hotarumaru
 Descending Stories: Showa Genroku Rakugo Shinju – Kotaro
 Spiritpact – Keika You
 ACCA: 13-Territory Inspection Dept. – Danlin
 Sakurada Reset – Yōsuka Sakagami
 Record of Grancrest War – Alexis Doucet
 Kono Oto Tomare! Sounds of Life – Kouta Mizuhara
 Beastars – Kibi
 The Case Files of Jeweler Richard – Haruyoshi Shimomura
 Shadowverse (–present) – Maura Aberald
 Healin' Good Pretty Cure (–21) – Michio Masuko
 I-Chu: Halfway Through the Idol – Kanata Minato

Tokusatsu
 Kamen Rider Ex-Aid (2017) – Gatton Bugster. (Ep. 19, 24, 34)

Drama CDs
 Rose of Versailles – Charles

Video games
 Lucky Dog 1' – Giulio di Bondone (PC Adult, as Yuuma Aoi)
 Tokimeki Memorial Girl's Side: 3rd Story – Kasuga (春日太陽) (DS, Also premium in 2012)
 Durarara!! 3way standoff  – Koji Yatabe (谷田部浩二) (PSP)
 Secret Game Code: Revise – Shiji Mitsurinori (三ツ林司) (PC Adult, as Yuuma Aoi, also 2nd Stage in 2013)
 With God Kimi – Foreigner Reiko (水庭苓)(PSP)
 If My Heart Had Wings series (–16) – Masatsugu Tasaki(PC Adult, as Yuuma Aoi)
 Ozmafia – Soh (also vivace in 2015)
 Arcana Famiglia 2 – Elmo (エルモ) (PSP)
 Gaist Crusher – Hayato Konkōji (DS, also God in 2014)
 MapleStory – Will
 12-Sai. Honto no Kimochi – Kazuma Hiyama (DS)
 Touken Ranbu – Hotarumaru
 Langrisser Re:Incarnation Tensei – Yoa Yuten (DS) 
 The Asterisk War – Silas Norman
 Genshin Impact – Shikanoin Heizou, Teppei
 Fuga: Melodies of Steel 2 – Britz Strudel

References

External links
  at Haikyo 
 
 

Japanese male voice actors
Living people
Male voice actors from Tokyo
1981 births
21st-century Japanese male actors
Tokyo Actor's Consumer's Cooperative Society voice actors